Powhattan Township is a township in Brown County, Kansas, USA.  As of the 2000 census, its population was 874.

Geography
According to the USGS, it contains two cemeteries: Powhattan and South Powhattan.

The streams of Plum Creek, Pony Creek, Roys Creek and Squaw Creek run through this township.

Transportation
Powhattan Township contains one airport or landing strip, Croxton Airport.

References
 USGS Geographic Names Information System (GNIS)

External links
 US-Counties.com
 City-Data.com

Townships in Brown County, Kansas
Townships in Kansas